Local elections were held in Pasay on January 18, 1988 within the Philippine general election. The voters elected for the elective local posts in the city: the mayor, vice mayor, the representative for the lone district, and the councilors, six of them in the two districts of the city.

Background 
Mayor Pablo Cuneta ran for re-election. He was challenged by former Vice Mayor Eduardo "Duay" Calixto, former Mayor Jovito Claudio, and former Councilor Wenceslao Trinidad

Ibarra Cruz faced J. Ochoa and Popoy Monsod

Lorna Verano-Yap ran as representative of city's lone district.

Results

For Representative, Lone District 
Lorna Verano-Yap, daughter of 1951 senatorial candidate Felisberto Verano won the elections.

For Mayor 
Mayor Pablo Cuneta defeated former Vice Mayor Eduardo "Duay" Calixto  in mayoral race.

For Vice Mayor 
J. Ochoa defeated Ibarra Cruz and Popoy Monsod.

Note
This article is subject for further revisions since limited information about the topic are at hand.

References

Pasay
Elections in Pasay